Tamaz Chiladze (5 March 1931 – 28 September 2018) was a Georgian writer, dramatist and poet. He was the elder brother of Georgian writer Otar Chiladze.

Biography
Chiladze was born to the family of an economist and a writer in 1931 in Signagi, Georgia. He graduated from the Department of Philology of Tbilisi State University in 1954. In the same year, Chiladze published his first collection of poems. Ciskari magazine printed his first story, Taking the Walk with the Pony Phaeton. In 1965, his play The Aquarium was staged at the Rustaveli Theater. He had since been recognized as the author of the anthology of Georgian classical dramaturgy. According to the author, the first critic of his writings was his mother, who was a poet herself.

Works and awards

Chiladze's works have been translated into different languages. He was awarded several prizes, among them the Shota Rustaveli National Prize and the First Prize of West German Broadcasting for the radio-play The Paradise Quartet.

Novels
The Wander by Pont Cart
Winter is Over
The Pond
The Sunset Lights
The Brueghel Moon

Poems
The Sun Dial
The Memory
The December Sun
The Noon

Plays
The Debutante's Role
The Eighth Floor Nest
The Aroma Grass of Arabia
The Day We Met
The Farewell to Lions

References

1931 births
2018 deaths
20th-century poets from Georgia (country)
Nobility of Georgia (country)
Rustaveli Prize winners
Magic realism writers
Psychological fiction writers
Male poets from Georgia (country)
20th-century male writers
People from Tiflis Governorate